This article lists the heads of government of Sudan, from the establishment of the office of Chief Minister in 1952 until the present day. The office of Prime Minister was abolished after the 1989 coup d'état, and reestablished in 2017 when Bakri Hassan Saleh was appointed Prime Minister by President Omar al-Bashir.

Abdalla Hamdok was appointed as Prime Minister by the Sovereignty Council on 21 August 2019, as part of the country's transition to democracy. On 25 October 2021, Hamdok was deposed and placed under house arrest, following a coup d'état. On 21 November 2021, Hamdok was reinstated as prime minister as part of an agreement with the military. On 2 January 2022, Hamdok resigned as prime minister.

Titles of heads of government
 1952–1956: Chief Minister
 1956–1989; 2017–present: Prime Minister

Heads of government of Sudan (1952–present)

(Dates in italics indicate de facto continuation of office)

Timeline

Notes

See also
 Politics of Sudan
 List of governors of pre-independence Sudan
 List of heads of state of Sudan
 Vice President of Sudan
 Lists of office-holders

References

External links
 World Statesmen – Sudan

Government of Sudan
History of Sudan
Sudan
 
1956 establishments in Sudan
Heads of government
Heads of government